Eurasia is the largest continental area on Earth, comprising all of Europe and Asia. According to some geographers, physiographically, Eurasia is a single continent. The concepts of Europe and Asia as distinct continents date back to antiquity, but their borders are arbitrary and have historically been subject to change. Eurasia is connected to Africa at the Suez Canal, and the two are sometimes combined to describe the largest contiguous landmass on Earth, Afro-Eurasia.

Geography
Primarily in the Northern and Eastern Hemispheres, Eurasia spans from Iceland and the Iberian Peninsula in the west to the Russian Far East, and from the Russian Far North to Maritime Southeast Asia in the south. Eurasia is bordered by Africa to the southwest, the Atlantic Ocean to the west, the Arctic Ocean to the north, the Pacific Ocean to the east, and the Indian Ocean to the south. The division between Europe and Asia as two continents is a historical social construct, as neither fits the usual definition; thus, in some parts of the world, Eurasia is recognized as the largest of the six, five, or four continents on Earth. 

The landmass contains well over 5 billion people, equating to approximately 70% of the human population. Humans first settled in Eurasia from Africa 125,000 years ago. 

Due to its vast size and differences in latitude, Eurasia exhibits all types of climates under the Köppen classification, including the harshest types of hot and cold temperatures, high and low precipitation, and various types of ecosystems.

Geology 

In geology, Eurasia is often considered as a single rigid megablock, but this is debated. Eurasia formed between 375 and 325 million years ago with the merging of Siberia, Kazakhstania, and Baltica, which was joined to Laurentia (now North America), to form Euramerica.

Rivers
This is a list of the longest rivers in Eurasia.

Mountains
All of the 100 highest mountains on Earth are in Eurasia, in the Himalaya, Karakoram, Hindu Kush, Pamir, Hengduan, and Tian Shan mountain ranges, and all peaks above 7,000 metres are in these ranges and the Transhimalaya. Other high ranges include the Kunlun, Hindu Raj, and Caucasus Mountains. The Alpide belt stretches 15,000 km across southern Eurasia, from Java in Maritime Southeast Asia to the Iberian Peninsula in Western Europe, including the ranges of the Himalayas, Karakoram, Hindu Kush, Alborz, Caucasus, and the Alps. Long ranges outside the Alpide Belt include the East Siberian, Altai, Scandinavian, Qinling, Western Ghats, Vindhya, Byrranga, and Annamite Ranges.

Islands
The largest Eurasian islands by area are Borneo, Sumatra, Honshu, Great Britain, Sulawesi, Java, Luzon, Iceland, Mindanao, Ireland, Hokkaido, Sakhalin, and Sri Lanka. The five most-populated islands in the world are Java, Honshu, Great Britain, Luzon, and Sumatra. Other Eurasian islands with large populations include Mindanao, Taiwan, Salsette, Borneo, Sri Lanka, Sulawesi, Kyushu, and Hainan. The most densely-populated islands in Eurasia are Caubian Gamay Island, Ap Lei Chau, and Navotas Island. In the Arctic Ocean, Severny Island, Nordaustlandet, October Revolution Island, and Bolshevik Island are Eurasia's largest uninhabited islands, and Kotelny Island, Alexandra Land, and Spitsbergen are the least-densely populated.

History 

Eurasia has been the host of many ancient civilizations, including those based in Mesopotamia, the Indus Valley and China. In the Axial Age (mid-first millennium BCE), a continuous belt of civilizations stretched through the Eurasian subtropical zone from the Atlantic to the Pacific. This belt became the mainstream of world history for two millennia.

Russian geopolitical ideology 
Originally, "Eurasia" is a geographical notion: in this sense, it is simply the biggest continent; the combined landmass of Europe and Asia. However, geopolitically, the word has several meanings, reflecting specific geopolitical interests. "Eurasia" is one of the most important geopolitical concepts and it figures prominently in the commentaries on the ideas of Halford Mackinder. As Zbigniew Brzezinski observed on Eurasia:

The Russian "Eurasianism" corresponded initially more or less to the land area of Imperial Russia in 1914, including parts of Eastern Europe. One of Russia's main geopolitical interests lies in ever closer integration with those countries that it considers part of "Eurasia." 

The term Eurasia gained geopolitical reputation as one of the three superstates in 1984, George Orwell's novel where constant surveillance and propaganda are strategic elements (introduced as reflexive antagonists) of the heterogeneous dispositif such metapolitical constructs used to control and exercise power.

Regional organisations and alliances 
Across Eurasia, several single markets have emerged, including the Eurasian Economic Space, European Single Market, ASEAN Economic Community, and the Gulf Cooperation Council. There are also several international organizations and initiatives which seek to promote integration throughout Eurasia, including:

Asia-Europe Meeting 
 Every two years since 1996 a meeting of most Asian and European countries is organised as the Asia–Europe Meeting (ASEM).

Commonwealth of Independent States 

 The Commonwealth of Independent States (CIS) is a political and economic association of 10 post-Soviet republics in Eurasia formed following the dissolution of the Soviet Union. It has an estimated population of 239,796,010. The CIS encourages cooperation in economic, political, and military affairs and has certain powers to coordinate trade, finance, lawmaking and security. In addition, six members of the CIS have joined the Collective Security Treaty Organization, an intergovernmental military alliance that was founded in 1992.

Eurasian Union 

  Similar in concept to the European Union, the Eurasian Union is an economic union established in 2015 including Russia, Armenia, Belarus, Kazakhstan, Kyrgyzstan and observer members Moldova, Uzbekistan, and Cuba. It is headquartered in Moscow, Russia and Minsk, Belarus. The union promotes economic integration among members and is theoretically open to enlargement to include any country in Europe or Asia.

Federation of Euro-Asian Stock Exchanges 
 The Federation of Euro-Asian Stock Exchanges (FEAS) is an international organization headquartered in Yerevan, comprising the main stock exchanges in Eastern Europe, the Middle East and Central Asia. The purpose of the Federation is to contribute to the cooperation, development, support and promotion of capital markets in the Eurasian region.

Russia-EU Common Spaces 
 The Russia – EU Four Common Spaces Initiative, is a joint European Union and Russian agreement to closer integrate Russia and the EU, remove barriers to trade and investment and promote reforms and competitiveness. In 2010, Russian Prime Minister Vladimir Putin called for common economic space, free-trade area or more advanced economic integration, stretching from Lisbon to Vladivostok. However, no significant progress was made and the project was put on hold after Russia-EU relations deteriorated following the Russo-Ukrainian War in 2014.

Shanghai Cooperation Organisation 

 The Shanghai Cooperation Organisation is a Eurasian political, economic and security alliance, the creation of which was announced on 15 June 2001 in Shanghai, China. It is the largest regional organisation in the world in terms of geographical coverage and population, covering three-fifths of the Eurasian continent and nearly half of the human population.

Use of term

History of the Europe–Asia division 

In ancient times, the Greeks classified Europe (derived from the mythological Phoenician princess Europa) and Asia which to the Greeks originally included Africa (derived from Asia, a woman in Greek mythology) as separate "lands". Where to draw the dividing line between the two regions is still a matter of discussion. Especially whether the Kuma-Manych Depression or the Caucasus Mountains form the southeast boundary is disputed, since Mount Elbrus would be part of Europe in the latter case, making it (and not Mont Blanc) Europe's highest mountain. Most accepted is probably the boundary as defined by Philip Johan von Strahlenberg in the 18th century. He defined the dividing line along the Aegean Sea, Dardanelles, Sea of Marmara, Bosporus, Black Sea, Kuma–Manych Depression, Caspian Sea, Ural River, and the Ural Mountains.  However, at least part of this definition has been subject to criticism by many modern analytical geographers like Halford Mackinder, who saw little validity in the Ural Mountains as a boundary between continents.

Geography 
In modern usage, the term "Eurasian" is a demonym usually meaning "of or relating to Eurasia" or "a native or inhabitant of Eurasia". It is also used to describe people of combined "Asian" and "European" descent.

Located primarily in the eastern and northern hemispheres, Eurasia is considered a supercontinent, part of the supercontinent of Afro-Eurasia or simply a continent in its own right. In plate tectonics, the Eurasian Plate includes Europe and most of Asia but not the Indian subcontinent, the Arabian Peninsula or the area of the Russian Far East east of the Chersky Range.

From the point of view of history and culture, Eurasia can be loosely subdivided into Western and Eastern Eurasia.

Soviet states after decentralization 

Nineteenth-century Russian philosopher Nikolai Danilevsky defined Eurasia as an entity separate from Europe and Asia, bounded by the Himalayas, the Caucasus, the Alps, the Arctic, the Pacific, the Atlantic, the Mediterranean, the Black Sea and the Caspian Sea, a definition that has been influential in Russia and other parts of the former Soviet Union. Nowadays, partly inspired by this usage, the term Eurasia is sometimes used to refer to the post-Soviet space – in particular Russia, the Central Asian republics, and the Transcaucasus republics – and sometimes also adjacent regions such as Turkey and Mongolia.

The word "Eurasia" is often used in Kazakhstan to describe its location. Numerous Kazakh institutions have the term in their names, like the L. N. Gumilev Eurasian National University (Lev Gumilev's Eurasianism ideas having been popularized in Kazakhstan by Olzhas Suleimenov), the Eurasian Media Forum, the Eurasian Cultural Foundation, the Eurasian Development Bank, and the Eurasian Bank. In 2007 Kazakhstan's president, Nursultan Nazarbayev, proposed building a "Eurasia Canal" to connect the Caspian Sea and the Black Sea via Russia's Kuma-Manych Depression to provide Kazakhstan and other Caspian-basin countries with a more efficient path to the ocean than the existing Volga-Don Canal.

This usage can also be seen in the names of Eurasianet, The Journal of Eurasian Studies, and the Association for Slavic, East European, and Eurasian Studies, as well as the titles of numerous academic programmes at US universities.

This usage is comparable to how Americans use "Western Hemisphere" to describe concepts and organizations dealing with the Americas (e.g., Council on Hemispheric Affairs, Western Hemisphere Institute for Security Cooperation).

See also 

 Asia-Europe Foundation
 Asia–Europe Meeting
 Afro-Eurasia
 Borders of the continents
 Council of Europe
 Community for Democracy and Rights of Nations
 Eastern European Group
 Eastern Partnership
 Eurasia (Nineteen Eighty-Four)
 Eurasian (disambiguation)
 Eurasian Economic Community
 Eurasia Tunnel
 Eurasia Canal
 Eurasian Union
 Eurasianism
 European Union
 Euronest Parliamentary Assembly
 Federation of Euro-Asian Stock Exchanges
 Intermediate Region
 Laurasia, a geological supercontinent joining Eurasia and North America.
 List of Eurasian countries by population
 Marmaray, railway tunnel links Europe to Asia.
 Neo-Eurasianism
 Organization of the Black Sea Economic Cooperation
 Organization for Security and Co-operation in Europe
 Palearctic 
 Shanghai Cooperation Organisation
 Silk Road
 United States of Eurasia
 Vega expedition, the first voyage to circumnavigate Eurasia

References

Further reading 
 The Dawn of Eurasia: On the Trail of the New World Order by Bruno Maçães, Publisher: Allen Lane
 
 D. Lane, V. Samokhvalov, The Eurasian Project and Europe Regional Discontinuities and Geopolitics, Palgrave: Basingstoke (2015)
 V. Samokhvalov, The new Eurasia: post-Soviet space between Russia, Europe and China, European Politics and Society, Volume 17, 2016 – Issue sup1: The Eurasian Project in Global Perspective (Journal homepage)

External links 

 

 
Supercontinents